Aurélie Bailon (born 16 January 1987) is a French female rugby union player. She represented  at the 2010 Women's Rugby World Cup. France lost to the Black Ferns in the semi-finals.  She returned from injury to play in the 2013 Women's Six Nations Championship match against .

References

1987 births
Living people
French female rugby union players
Place of birth missing (living people)